Gary Parkes (born 2 July 1951) is  a former Australian rules footballer who played with Essendon and Richmond in the Victorian Football League (VFL).

Notes

External links 
		
Gary Parkes's profile at Essendonfc.com

1951 births
Living people
Australian rules footballers from Victoria (Australia)
Essendon Football Club players
Richmond Football Club players
Pascoe Vale Football Club players